A rusty nail is a cocktail made by mixing Scotch whisky with Drambuie in a 1:1 to 2:1 ratio. A rusty nail is most commonly served on the rocks in an old-fashioned glass (a.k.a. a rocks glass), although it can also be served "up" in a stemmed glass. Its origin goes back to the 1937 British Industries Fair, but it did not become popular until the 1950s endorsement by New York's Club 21 and its recognition by popular culture as the go-to cocktail of the Rat Pack a decade later.

Variations
Variations of the drink can be made using any aged spirit with the Drambuie (its one essential ingredient), although using blended Scotch whisky in a 1 to 1 or 2 to 1 ratio is traditional. The addition of additional Drambuie tends to sweeten the cocktail. The cocktail can be garnished with a twist of citrus, usually orange, that will enhance the acidity and flavor.

Other variations include:
 The rusty ale, in which a shot of Drambuie is added to any beer (served without ice)
 The rusty Bob, that substitutes Bourbon whiskey for blended Scotch whisky
 The rusty Compass, adds cherry liqueur to the rusty nail mix
 The smoky nail, that uses peated Isley single malt whisky (very smoky in flavor) in place of blended Scotch whisky
 Another smoky nail that is known in Spanish as the clavo ahumado; it uses mezcal instead of whisky
 The Donald Sutherland, substitutes Canadian rye whisky for the blended Scotch whisky

History
According to cocktail historian David Wondrich, "...the Rusty Nail took a while to find its proper place in the world".  The combination of Drambuie—"the world's most distinguished Scotch-based liqueur"—and the whisky it is made from first appears in 1937 in the form of the B.I.F., credited to one F. Benniman and ostensibly named after the British Industries Fair. Wondrich goes on to note that. "it took another generation or so for the drink to assume its classic name and form, during which time it tried on several identities. Here it's a D&S...there a Little Club No. 1 (the Little Club being a rather swank sort of joint on East Fifty-fifth Street much haunted by showbiz types); at USAF Officers' Clubs in Thailand and the Republic of Viet-Nam, it's a Mig-21, while in the upper Midwest it's a Knucklehead."

The cocktail authority Dale DeGroff said "the Rusty Nail is often credited to the clever bartenders at the 21 Club in Manhattan sometime in the early 1960s"  The cocktail's name was finally cemented in 1963, when Gina MacKinnon, the chairwoman of the Drambuie Liqueur Company, gave the rusty nail her endorsement in The New York Times.  DeGroff reported that in the early 1960s "...the Rat Pack was enamored of the drink, which may have been responsible for the wide appeal in those years..."

References

Cocktails with Scotch whisky
Cocktails with liqueur
Two-ingredient cocktails